Munjava Modruška is a village in Croatia, under the Josipdol township, in Karlovac County.

References

Populated places in Karlovac County